Anpirtoline (chemical formula C10H13ClN2S) is a synthetic chemical compound used as a 5-HT1B receptor agonist as well as a 5-HT3 receptor antagonist, causing a decrease in serotonin synthesis and a reduction in aggressive behavior. Anpirtoline hydrochloride appears as a white solid and is soluble in water. Being synthetic, the compound can be purchased from suppliers.

Properties

Physical 
Anpirtoline hydrochloride appears as a white solid at room temperature and is soluble in water and DMSO. Its has a density of 1.27 g/cm3 and a molar mass of 265.20. Structurally, the most notable parts of anpirtoline hydrochloride are two six-membered rings bonded via a sulfur atom.

Chemical 
The melting point of anpirtoline hydrochloride is 126-128 °C. The flash point of the compound is 174 °C. Many of Anpirtoline hydrochloride's chemical properties remain unknown or untested.

Uses
Currently, anpirtoline is primarily used for research purposes due to its receptor agonist and receptor antagonist properties. Studies involving social instigation, aggression, and other behavioral traits make ample use of the compound.

Storage 
Anpirtoline hydrochloride should be stored in a cool, well-ventilated area that is not exposed to direct sunlight.

References

5-HT1B agonists
5-HT3 antagonists
Chloroarenes
4-Piperidinyl compounds
Pyridines
Thioethers